Bohumila Řimnáčová (born 9 September 1947 in Prague) is a Czech former gymnast who competed in the 1968 Summer Olympics.

References

1947 births
Living people
Czech female artistic gymnasts
Olympic gymnasts of Czechoslovakia
Gymnasts at the 1968 Summer Olympics
Olympic silver medalists for Czechoslovakia
Olympic medalists in gymnastics
Gymnasts from Prague
Medalists at the 1968 Summer Olympics